"A Gift for Kinza" is a short story by Paul Bowles written in 1950 and published in the March 1951 issue of Esquire magazine. The story was published under the title "The Successor" in later collections such as The Hours After Noon (1959, Heinemann) and The Time of Friendship (1967, Holt, Rinehart and Winston). The work was completed in Kandy, Sri Lanka.
"The Successor" is one of the three fables that appear in Bowles's short fiction collection The Time of Friendship (1967). The other two are "The Hyena" (1962) and "The Garden" (1964).

Plot 
Ali resides with his older brother, the proprietor of a cafe (with accent) in Morocco. The younger brother is disaffected and resents his obligation to assist his elder sibling in the operation of the establishment as required by  primogeniture. Ali also objects to his brother's indulgence in alcohol, a violation of Islamic strictures, as well as his courting of a local girl, Kinza, who the brother hopes to seduce. 

A  Belgian tourist seeking shelter from a rainstorm at the café shares beers with the elder proprietor. The visitor possesses a prescription of powerful sleeping pills. He gladly provides the elder brother with enough of the sedative to immobilize a person. Ali overhears the transaction. The older brother returns to the cafe the next day after visiting Kinza. Ali notes his agitation. The following day police arrive and interrogate the brother. He admits that he did not understand the deadly risks associated with the soporific he had furtively administered to the young women. He is arrested for murder of Kinza. Ali dispassionately recognizes that he will soon come into possession of the café.

Theme
Literary critic John Ditsky writes:

Footnotes

Sources 
 Bowles, Paul. 2001. Paul Bowles; Collected Stories, 1939-1976. Black Sparrow Press. Santa Rosa. 2001.
Ditsky, John. 1986. The Time of Friendship: The Short Stories of Paul Bowles. Twentieth Century Literature, 34, no. 3-4 (1986) pp. 373-377. 
Hibbard, Allen. 1993. Paul Bowles: A Study of the Short Fiction. Twayne Publishers. New York. 

1951 short stories
Short stories by Paul Bowles
Works originally published in Esquire (magazine)